This is a list of John Carradine's hundreds of theatrical films.  Television appearances and television movies are not included.

1930s

 Bright Lights (1930) as Telegraph Newspaper Photographer (uncredited)
 Tol'able David (1930) as Buzzard Hatburn (as Peter Richmond)
 Heaven on Earth (1931) as Chicken Sam (as Peter Richmond)
 Forgotten Commandments (1932) as First Orator (uncredited) 
 The Sign of the Cross (1932) as Christian Martyr / Gladiator Leader / Voice in Coliseum Mob / Voice of Roman (uncredited)
 Murders in the Rue Morgue (1932) (uncredited)
 The Story of Temple Drake (1933) as Courtroom Spectator (uncredited)
 Morning Glory (1933) as Dream Apparition (uncredited)
 This Day and Age (1933) as Assistant Principal Abernathy
 To the Last Man (1933) as Pete Garon (uncredited)
 The Invisible Man (1933) as Informer Suggesting Ink (uncredited)
 The Meanest Gal in Town (1934) as Stranded Actor (uncredited)
 The Black Cat (1934) as Cult Organist (uncredited)
 Cleopatra (1934) as Roman Citizen / Party Guest / Soldier (voice, uncredited)
 Clive of India (1935) as Drunken-Faced Clerk (uncredited)
 Transient Lady (1935) as Ren Baxter (uncredited)
 Les Misérables (1935) as Enjolras
 Cardinal Richelieu (1935) as Agitator
 Bride of Frankenstein (1935) as Hunter at Hermit's Cottage (uncredited)
 Alias Mary Dow (1935) as Griffe - Nightclub Drunk (uncredited)
 She Gets Her Man (1935) as Lunchroom customer (uncredited)
 The Crusades (1935) as Leopold - Duke of Austria / A French King / A Wise Man (uncredited)
 Bad Boy (1935) as Angry Saxophone Player - Tenant (uncredited)
 The Man Who Broke the Bank at Monte Carlo (1935) as Despondent Casino Gambler (uncredited)
 Dublin in Brass (1935) (uncredited)
 Anything Goes (1936) as Bearded Ballet Master (uncredited)
 The Prisoner of Shark Island (1936) as Sgt. Rankin
 A Message to Garcia (1936) as President William McKinley (voice, uncredited)
 Under Two Flags (1936) as Cafard
 Half Angel (1936) as Sanatorium Inmate (voice, uncredited)
 White Fang (1936) as Beauty Smith
 Mary of Scotland (1936) as David Rizzio
 Ramona (1936) as Jim Farrar
 Dimples (1936) as Richards
 The Garden of Allah (1936) as Sand Diviner
 Daniel Boone (1936) as Simon Girty
 Winterset (1936) as Bartolomio Romagna
 Laughing at Trouble (1936) as Deputy Sheriff Alec Brady
 Nancy Steele Is Missing! (1937) as Harry Wilkins
 Captains Courageous (1937) as 'Long Jack'
 This Is My Affair (1937) as Ed
 Love Under Fire (1937) as Capt. Delmar
 Danger - Love at Work (1937) as Herbert Pemberton
 Ali Baba Goes to Town (1937) as Ishak / Broderick
 The Hurricane (1937) as Warden
 The Last Gangster (1937) as Casper
 Thank You, Mr. Moto (1937) as Pereira
 International Settlement (1938) as Murdock
 Of Human Hearts (1938) as President Lincoln
 Four Men and a Prayer (1938) as General Adolfo Arturios Gregario Sebastian
 Kentucky Moonshine (1938) as Reef Hatfield
 Alexander's Ragtime Band (1938) as Taxi Driver
 Kidnapped (1938) as Gordon
 I'll Give a Million (1938) as Kopelpeck
 Gateway (1938) as Leader of Refugees
 Submarine Patrol (1938) as McAllison
 Jesse James (1939) as Bob Ford
 Mr. Moto's Last Warning (1939) as Danforth / Richard Burke
 Stagecoach (1939) as Hatfield
 The Three Musketeers (1939) as Naveau
 The Hound of the Baskervilles (1939) as Barryman
 Captain Fury (1939) as Coughy / Roger Bradford
 Five Came Back (1939) as Crimp
 Frontier Marshal (1939) as Ben Carter
 Drums Along the Mohawk (1939) as Caldwell

1940s

 The Grapes of Wrath (1940) as Jim Casy
 The Return of Frank James (1940) as Bob Ford
 Brigham Young (1940) as Porter Rockwell
 Chad Hanna (1940) as B.D. Bisbee
 Western Union (1941) as Doc Murdoch
 Blood and Sand (1941) as El Nacional
 Man Hunt (1941) as Mr. Jones
 Swamp Water (1941) as Jesse Wick
 Son of Fury: The Story of Benjamin Blake (1942) as Caleb Green
 Whispering Ghosts (1942) as Norbert (Long Jack)
 Northwest Rangers (1942) as Martin Caswell
 Reunion in France (1942) as Ulrich Windler
 I Escaped from the Gestapo (1943) as Martin - Gestapo Agent
 Captive Wild Woman (1943) as Dr. Sigmund Walters
 Hitler's Madman (1943) as Reinhardt Heydrich
 Silver Spurs (1943) as Lucky Miller
 Isle of Forgotten Sins (1943) (a.k.a. Monsoon) as Mike Clancy
 Revenge of the Zombies (1943) as Dr. Max Heinrich Von Altermann
 Gangway for Tomorrow (1943) as Mr. Wellington
 Voodoo Man (1944) as Toby
 The Adventures of Mark Twain (1944) as Bret Harte
 The Black Parachute (1944) as General von Bodenbach
 The Invisible Man's Revenge (1944) as Doctor Peter Drury
 Waterfront (1944) as Victor Marlow
 The Mummy's Ghost (1944) as Yousef Bey
 Return of the Ape Man (1944) as Prof. John Gilmore
 Barbary Coast Gent (1944) as Duke Cleat
 Bluebeard (1944) as Gaston Morel
 Alaska (1944) as John Reagan
 House of Frankenstein (1944) as Count Dracula / Baron Latos
 It's in the Bag! (1945) as Jefferson T. Pike
 Fallen Angel (1945) as Professor Madley
 Captain Kidd (1945) as Orange Povy
 House of Dracula (1945) as Count Dracula / Baron Latos
 The Face of Marble (1946) as Dr. Charles Randolph
 Down Missouri Way (1946) as Thorndyke 'Thorny' P. Dunning
 The Private Affairs of Bel Ami (1947) as Charles Forestier
 C-Man (1949) as Doc Spencer

1950s

 Casanova's Big Night (1954) as Minister Foressi
 Johnny Guitar (1954) as Old Tom
 The Egyptian (1954) as Grave Robber
 Thunder Pass (1954) as Bergstrom
 Female Jungle (1955) as Claude Almstead
 Stranger on Horseback (1955) as Col. Buck Streeter
 The Kentuckian (1955) as Ziby Fletcher
 Desert Sands (1955) as Jala the Wine Merchant
 The Court Jester (1956) as Giacomo
 Dark Venture (1956) as Gideon
 Hidden Guns (1956) as Snipe Harding
 The Black Sleep (1956) as Borg aka Bohemond
 The Ten Commandments (1956) as Aaron
 Around the World in 80 Days (1956) as Col. Stamp Proctor - San Francisco Politico
 The True Story of Jesse James (1957) as Rev. Jethro Bailey
 The Unearthly (1957) as Dr. Charles Conway
 The Story of Mankind (1957) as Khufu
 Hell Ship Mutiny (1957) as Malone
 The Incredible Petrified World (1957) as Prof. Millard Wyman
 Showdown at Boot Hill (1958) as Doc Weber
 The Proud Rebel (1958) as Traveling Salesman
 The Last Hurrah (1958) as Amos Force
 Half Human: The Story of the Abominable Snowman (1958) as Dr. John Rayburn - Narrator (English version only)
 The Cosmic Man (1959) as Cosmic Man
 Invisible Invaders (1959) as Dr. Karol Noymann
 Invasion of the Animal People (1959) as Voice of Narrator (English version only)
 The Oregon Trail (1959) as Zachariah Garrison

1960s

 The Adventures of Huckleberry Finn (1960) as Slave Catcher
 Tarzan the Magnificent (1960) as Abel Banton
 Sex Kittens Go to College (1960) as Prof. Watts
 The Man Who Shot Liberty Valance (1962) as Maj. Cassius Starbuckle
 The Patsy (1964) as Bruce Alden
 Cheyenne Autumn (1964) as Jeff Blair
 Genesis (1964) as Narrator
 Curse of the Stone Hand (1964) as The Old Drunk
 The Wizard of Mars (1965) as The Wizard of Mars
 Psycho A-Go-Go (1965) as Dr. Vanard
 House of the Black Death (1965) as Andre Desard
 Broken Sabre (1965-1966) as General Joshua McCord
 The Emperor's New Clothes (1966) as King Luvimself
 Billy the Kid Versus Dracula (1966) as a nameless vampire, posing as James Underhill
 Munster, Go Home! (1966) as Cruikshank
 Night Train to Mundo Fine (1966) as Mr. Wilson
 The Fiend with the Electronic Brain (1966) as Dr. Howard Vanard
 Dr. Terror's Gallery of Horrors (1967) as Narrator / Tristram Halbin
 Hillbillys in a Haunted House (1967) as Dr. Himmil
 The Hostage (1967) as Otis Lovelace
 Antologia del miedo (1968) (short)
 The Helicopter Spies (1968) as Third-Way Priest
 They Ran for Their Lives (1968) as Laslo
 The Astro-Zombies (1968) as Dr. DeMarco
 Autopsia de un fantasma (1968) (a.k.a. Autopsy of a Ghost) as Satán
 Pacto diabólico (1969) (a.k.a. Diabolical Pact) as Dr. Halback
 The Trouble with Girls (1969) as Mr. Drewcolt
 Blood of Dracula's Castle (1969) as George - the butler
 Las Vampiras (1969) (a.k.a. The Vampires) as Count Branos Alucard
 The Good Guys and the Bad Guys (1969) as Ticker
 Five Bloody Graves (1969) as Boone Hawkins
 Enigma de muerte (1969) as Mad Doctor / Nazi Leader
 La Señora Muerte (1969) (a.k.a. Madame Death) as Dr. Favel
 The Mummy and the Curse of the Jackals (1969) as Prof. Cummings

1970s

 Hell's Bloody Devils (1970) (a.k.a. The Fakers (TV title)) as Pet Shop Owner
 Cain's Cutthroats (1970) as Preacher Simms
 Horror of the Blood Monsters (1970) (a.k.a. Creatures of the Prehistoric Planet, Creatures of the Red Planet, Space Mission to the Lost Planet, Vampire Men of the Lost Planet) as Dr. Rynning
 Blood of the Iron Maiden (1970) (a.k.a. Trip to Terror (reissue title)) as Dr. Goolie
 Myra Breckinridge (1970) as Surgeon
 Shinbone Alley (1970) as Tyrone T. Tattersall (voice)
 The McMasters (1970) as Preacher
 Bigfoot (1970) as Jasper B. Hawks
 Honey Britches (1971) as The Judge of Hell (uncredited)
 Blood Legacy (1971) (a.k.a. Legacy of Blood) as Christopher Dean
 Beast of the Yellow Night (1971)
 The Gatling Gun (1971) as Rev. Harper
 The Seven Minutes (1971) as Sean O'Flanagan
 Boxcar Bertha (1972) as H. Buckram Sartoris
 Portnoy's Complaint (1972) as Judge (voice, uncredited)
 Richard (1972) as Plastic Surgeon
 Everything You Always Wanted to Know About Sex* (*But Were Afraid to Ask) (1972) as Doctor Bernardo
 Silent Night, Bloody Night (1972) as Charlie Towman
 Blood of Ghastly Horror (1972) as Dr. Howard Vanard
 Terror in the Wax Museum (1973) as Claude Dupree
 Bad Charleston Charlie (1973) as Fritz Frugal - Reporter
 Superchick (1973) as Igor Smith
 The Cat Creature (1973) as Hotel Clerk
 Shadow House (1973) as Uncle
 The House of Seven Corpses (1974) as Edgar Price
 Moonchild (1974) as Mr. Walker
 Mary, Mary, Bloody Mary (1975) as The Man
 Won Ton Ton, the Dog Who Saved Hollywood (1976) as Drunk
 The Shootist (1976) as Beckum
 The Killer Inside Me (1976) as Dr. Jason Smith
 The Last Tycoon (1976) as Tour Guide
 Crash! (1977) as Dr. Welsey Edwards
 The Sentinel (1977) as Father Halliran
 The White Buffalo (1977) as Amos Briggs (Undertaker)
 Satan's Cheerleaders (1977) as The Bum
 The Mouse and His Child (1977) as The Tramp (voice)
 Shock Waves (1977) as Captain Ben Morris
 Golden Rendezvous (1977) (a.k.a. Nuclear Terror) as Fairweather
 Christmas Miracle in Caufield, U.S.A. (1977) as Grampa Sullivan
 The Lady and the Lynchings (1977)
 Doctor Dracula (1978) (a.k.a. Svengali) as Hadley Radcliff
 Sunset Cove (1978/I) as Judge Harley Winslow
 Vampire Hookers (1978) as Richmond Reed
 The Bees (1978) as Dr. Sigmund Hummel
 The Seekers (1979) as Avery Mills
 Missile X: The Neutron Bomb Incident (1978) (a.k.a. Teheran Incident and Cruise Missile) as Professor Nikolaeff
 Nocturna: Granddaughter of Dracula (1979) as Count Dracula

1980s

 Monster (1980) (a.k.a. Monstroid and The Toxic Horror) as The Priest
 The Boogeyman (1980) as Dr. Warren
 The Howling (1981) as Erle Kenton
 The Monster Club (1981) as Ronald Chetwynd-Hayes
 The Nesting (1981) (a.k.a. Massacre Mansion) as Col. LeBrun
 Goliath Awaits (1981) as Ronald Bentley
 Frankenstein Island (1981) as Dr. Frankenstein
 Aladdin and the Magic Lamp (1982) as The Wizard (voice)
 The Scarecrow (1982) as Hubert Salter
 Satan's Mistress (1982) as Father Stratten
 The Secret of NIMH (1982) as the Great Owl (voice)
 The Vals (1982) (a.k.a. Valley Girls) as Mr. Stanton - Head of the Orphanage
 House of the Long Shadows (1983) as Lord Elijah Grisbane
 Rose for Emily (1983) as Col. Sartoris
 The Ice Pirates (1984) as Supreme Commander
 Evils of the Night (1985) as Dr. Kozmar
 Prison Ship (1986) (a.k.a. Star Slammer) as The Justice
 Revenge (1986) (direct to video) (a.k.a. Revenge: Blood Cult 2) as Sen. Martin Bradford
 The Tomb (1986) as Mr. Andoheb
 Monster in the Closet (1986) as Old Joe Shempter
 Peggy Sue Got Married (1986) as Leo
 Evil Spawn (1987) as Dr. Emil Zeitman

1990s (Posthumous)
 Buried Alive (released in 1990) as Jacob Julian
 Jack-O (released in 1995) as Walter Machen (final film role)

External links
 

Carradine, John
Carradine, John